The Cricket Association for the Blind in India (CABI) is the apex body conducting cricket for the blind across India, having inherited responsibility in 2010 from the former Association for Cricket for the Blind in India (ACBI). Registered in 2011 as a non-profit organization, CABI is affiliated with the World Blind Cricket Council (WBCC) and promotes blind cricket both as a rightful pursuit and as a platform for the physical and social development of the visually impaired. Financial support is received from a range of public- and private-sector organizations.

Objectives 
 To create awareness about the abilities and talent of visually impaired youth through various platforms and provide opportunities for the exhibition of skills to a large audience.
 To organize a regular domestic calendar with coaching camps, tournaments at various levels as well as bilateral series and overseas tours
 To create a strong network and infrastructure by taking on board active local bodies and blind schools; formulating guidelines to monitor the same
 To help local bodies organize local level tournaments to spot talent; form teams with coaches, physiotherapists, trainers, umpires and other personnel to oversee them
 To work towards getting support from and affiliation with relevant public and private bodies

Officebearers 

 George Abraham (Founder and President) - 1996
 S. P. Nagesh (President)
 G. K. Mahantesh (General Secretary)
 D. E. John (Treasurer)

Important tournaments

Important milestones 
Source:

First T-20 World Cup Cricket Championship for the Blind - 2012 
 The first ever T – 20 World Cup Cricket for the Blind was held from 1 to 13 December 2012 in Bangalore.
 Participating countries included Australia, Bangladesh, England, Pakistan, South Africa, West Indies, Sri Lanka, Nepal and India
 The brand ambassador was Shri Sourav Ganguly, former captain of the Indian cricket team
 The title sponsor was State Bank of India
 36 matches were played between 2–11 December on a league cum knockout basis
 India and Pakistan contested the final on 13 December
 Team India emerged champions

Fourth One Day International World Cup Cricket Championship for the Blind - 2014  
 The 4th One Day World Cup was held in Cape Town, South Africa, from 27 November to 7 December 2014
 Participating countries included Sri Lanka, Bangladesh, South Africa, England, and Australia & India
 The Indian team comprising 17 players from 10 states in India, was led by Captain Shekhar Naik. The youngest player, simply called Golu, from Jharkhand, was 14 years old
 Team India successfully chased the stiff target of 389 runs set by Pakistan, defeating them in a pulsating climax
 The  Indian Team was received at the airport by Shri Ananth Kumar, Minister of Chemicals and & Fertilizers, Shri Thawar Chand Gehlot, Minister of Social Justice &  Empowerment and Shri Sarbananda Sonowal, Minister of Youth Affairs and Sports.
 The Prime Minister of India, Shri Narendra Modi, met the team at his official residence. Later in his radio address to the nation titled ‘Mann ki baat’, he portrayed the members of the blind cricket team as role models

First T20 Asia Cup Cricket Championship for the Blind - 2016
 The first-ever T20 Asia Cup Cricket Championship for the Blind 2016, was held in Kochi, Kerala, India  from 17 to 24 January 2016
 Participating countries included India Pakistan, Nepal, Bangladesh, Sri Lanka
 In all, 10 league matches were played between 8 and 22 January 2016
 The top two teams from the league matches, India & Pakistan, contested the finals played on 24 January 2016
 Chasing a massive target of 209 off 20 overs set by India, Pakistan crumbled to defeat with 163 off 18.4 overs 
 The Indian team is now the only team to win all three International Championships including the T20 World Cup, ODI World Cup and T20 Asia Cup 
 Congratulatory calls were received by the team from Mr Thawar Chand Gehlot, Minister for Social Justice & Empowerment and Mr Ananth Kumar, Union Minister for Chemicals & Fertilizers

Second T20 World Cup Cricket Tournament for the Blind
CABI-Samarthanam is glad to announce the Second T–20 World Cup Cricket Tournament for the Blind which will be
organized jointly by Cricket Association for the Blind in India (CABI) in association with Samarthanam from 28 January
to 12 February 2017. The hosting rights for the World Cup were conferred to CABI by World Blind Cricket Ltd. (WBC)
during the 17th Annual General Meeting of  WBC held in Cape Town, South Africa on 25 November 2014.

In T-20 World Cup 2017, all major test-playing countries will be participating. Confirmed participating nations include
Australia, Bangladesh, England, Nepal, New Zealand, Pakistan, South Africa, Sri Lanka and West Indies and the host,
India.
48 Matches will be played including Semi finals and Finals, on league cum knockout basis in multi cities across India.

A grand opening ceremony will be held with a ceremonial march past by all the participating teams, followed by cultural 
events, celebrity appearances and dance performances by known artists. Over 40,000 people are expected to be a part of  the
inaugural ceremony. The event will greatly bolster the game of  blind cricket and the cricketers.

References

External links 
 Cricket Association for the Blind in India on Instagram
 

Cricket administration in India
Sports governing bodies in India
Blind cricket administration
Parasports organizations
Blindness organisations in India
2011 establishments in Karnataka
Sports organizations established in 2011
Organisations based in Bangalore